Vitis retordii is a species of vining plant native to Asia. It is also known as the woolly grape.

References

External links
Flora of China: Vitis retordii
Plants of the World Online: Vitis retordii
International Plant Names Index: Vitis retordii
Global Biodiversity Information Facility: Vitis retordii

retordii
Flora of Asia